Rumbón is a Spanish-language classic salsa radio station on Sirius XM. It was formerly a tropical and reggaeton radio station on Sirius Satellite Radio channel 83 and DISH Network channel 6092. The station was titled "Tropical" until September 29, 2005, when it increased its programming of reggaeton to nearly 50 percent. The channel was added to Sirius Canada in June 2008. Rumbón was retired on November 12, 2008 in result of the Sirius XM merger. The station that took over is Caliente, Sirius 83 and XM 85. Rumbón was later relaunched on the 533 frequency. The channel launched the very popular program La Jungla de Rumbon hosted by George Nenadich. George Nenadich is a pioneer in the Latin music industry. Launching his career in 1989 as one of the first employees of a very young record label RMM Records who were responsible for artist like Tito Nieves, Jose Alberto, Marc Anthony and La India

See also
 List of Sirius Satellite Radio stations

References

External links
 Dish Network Official Website

Sirius XM Radio channels
Internet radio stations in the United States
Spanish-language radio stations in the United States
Radio stations established in 2002